GCompris is a software suite comprising educational entertainment software for children aged 2 to 10. GCompris was originally written in C and Python using the GTK+ widget toolkit, but a rewrite in C++ and QML using the Qt widget toolkit has been undertaken since early 2014. GCompris is free and open-source software and the current version is subject to the requirements of the AGPL-3.0-only license. It has been part of the GNU project.

The name GCompris is a pun, in the French language is pronounced the same as the phrase "I have understood", J'ai compris .

It is available for Linux, BSD, macOS, Windows and Android. While binaries compiled for Microsoft Windows and macOS were initially distributed with a restricted number of activities and a small fee was required to unlock all the activities, since February 2020 the full version is entirely free for all platforms.

Extent 
At the time of writing GCompris comprised more than 130 games, called "activities". These are bundled into the following groups:

 Computer discovery: keyboard, mouse, different mouse gestures
 Numeracy: table memory, enumeration, double entry table, mirror images
 Science: the canal lock, the water cycle, the submarine, electric simulations
 123Geography: place the country on the map
 Games: chess, memory, connect 4, oware, sudoku
 Reading: reading practice
 Other: learn to tell time, puzzle of famous paintings, vector drawing, cartoon making

Development history 

The first version of the game was made in 2000 by Bruno Coudoin, a French software engineer. Since the first release it was distributed freely on the Internet and was protected by the GNU General Public License. The motivation behind the development was to provide native educational application for Linux. Since then, the software has seen continuous improvements, in terms of graphics and number of activities, thanks to the help of many developers and graphic artists joining the project over the years.

There are two branches of GCompris; with released versions in each. The first, older of which is the GTK+ branch that contains 140 activities is now considered to be a legacy branch in maintenance mode, with no new development. The latest release of the GTK+ version is 15.10 of 18 October 2015.

The newer branch of GCompris is completely rewritten using Qt Quick. The current version is developed using JavaScript, QML and C++ languages.

References

External links 

 
 Download Windows, Linux and macOS versions
 Source code (Qt)
 Source code (Legacy)

2000 software
Children's educational video games
Educational software for Linux
Educational software for macOS
Educational software for Windows
Educational software that uses GTK
Educational software that uses Qt
Free and open-source Android software
Free educational software
Free learning support software
GNOME Kids
GNU Project software
KDE
Linux games
Educational video games
Open-source video games
Software for children
Software that uses QML
Software that was ported from GTK to Qt